Minggangia is an extinct genus of bird which fossils are discovered in Lizhuang Formation of Henan Province, China. This formation was dated back at the late Eocene period.

Classification
As in traditionally thought, this genus was an ibis, but it might be a species of the family Rallidae by some recent authorities.

References

 AN IBIS-LIKE BIRD (AVES:  CF . THRESKIORNITHIDAE) FROM THE LATE MIDDLE EOCENE OF MYANMAR

Eocene birds
Rallidae
†
Fossil taxa described in 1982
Prehistoric bird genera